Bill of Rights socialism is the ideology that the United States Bill of Rights advocated for a socialist society or that if need be, a new United States Bill of Rights that explicitly advocated for it should be made. The concept was first coined by Gus Hall, General Secretary of Communist Party USA. Communist Party USA has advocated for amending the United States Constitution to include the right to join a union, the right to a fair-paying job and others.

Bill of Rights socialism has also been advocated by the Democratic Socialists of America since 2012.

Concept 

In 2012, the concept was revived by the Democratic Socialists of America, who proposed the following public policies in order to "achieve basic human social and economic rights" whose implementation would "help to achieve freedom and dignity for all Americans":
 Single-payer healthcare
 Affordable and safe housing
 Universal childcare
 Progressive taxation
 Tuition-free higher education
 Income security
 Leisure time
 Healthy environment
 Free association
 Cutting military expenditures
 A return to a Keynesian model
 Maximum wage ceilings

Criticism 
The idea of Bill of Rights socialism has drawn criticism. Writing for the Future of Freedom Foundation, Richard Embley described Franklin D. Roosevelt's Second Bill of Rights and the idea of a socialist United States Bill of Rights as a command economy and "regulatory socialism". Other critics argue that socialism in the form of central planning is inherently incompatible with the constitutionally enforced federalism in the United States that includes a separation of powers and a degree of decentralization. Additionally, some American socialists believe that federalism protects established political interests and wish for a constitutional amendment to change it.

Similarly, about federalism in China, a centralized unitary socialist state, Wu Bangguo, former Chairman of the Standing Committee of the National People's Congress, said: "There will be no separation of powers between the different branches of government and no federal system. It is possible that the state could sink into the abyss of internal disorder [if this happened]".

References

External links 
 Bill of Rights socialism by Communist Party USA
 A Social and Economic Bill of Rights by Democratic Socialist of America

Constitution of the United States
History of the Communist Party USA
Left-wing politics in the United States
Political movements in the United States
Socialism in the United States